Johannes Christiaan Schotel (11 November 1787 – 21 December 1838) was a 19th-century painter from the Northern Netherlands known for his marines and artwork. Talent was handed down by generation to the next throughout the Schotel family producing numerous talented artists.

Biography
Schotel was born and died in Dordrecht.  According to the RKD he was the pupil of Adriaan Meulemans, Martinus Schouman, Abraham van Strij, and Jacob van Strij. He was a member of the Dordrecht artist's society Pictura and was the father of Petrus Johannes Schotel.

Schotel had left a legacy which remains in Dordecht to date, inside the Dordecht museum and throughout the world. He was a talented sailor and was admired for his depiction of the sea, specifically his ability to capture effects of light. Near to the end of his life he travelled to France and Belgium.

The 20th century art historian Pieter Scheen notes that J.C  Schotel produced 214 paintings and around 275 drawings and watercolours. Paintings of the elder Schotel are in the museums of Amsterdam, Dordecht, Haarlem, Otterlo and Rotterdam, as well as in Hannover, Munich.

Artwork by Schotel is continuously being sold internationally as of June 16, 2004, 'Fishing boats on the beach near Egmond at low tide' was sold in London, Signed 'J C Schotel' which valued the painting at £25,000 - which was sold 13 days before the birth of Spencer Schotel, in Hastings, England.

Schotel is regarded as the preeminent marine painter of the 19th century. His early illustrated studies can be found in the permanent collections of Princeton University Art Museum, New Jersey; The Morgan Library & Museum, New York; and The Metropolitan Museum of Art, New York. The painting, Low Tide Gun Salute From a Dutch Man o' War, measures a massive 63 1/2" tall and 84" wide. Until now, the paintings sold on the international market have dwarfed in comparison to this lot, which may be the largest of Schotel's paintings to public knowledge.

References

Johannes Schotel on Artnet
Johannes Schotel on Stephenongpin
Johannes Schotel on Bonhams
Johannes Schotel on Barnebys

1787 births
1838 deaths
19th-century Dutch painters
Dutch male painters
Artists from Dordrecht
Dutch marine artists
19th-century Dutch male artists